Hederellids are extinct colonial animals with calcitic tubular branching exoskeletons. They range from the Silurian to the Permian and were most common in the Devonian period. They are more properly known as "hederelloids" because they were originally defined as a suborder by Bassler (1939), who described about 130 species. Although they have traditionally been considered bryozoans, they are clearly not because of their branching patterns, lack of an astogenetic gradient, skeletal microstructure, and wide range in tube diameters (Wilson and Taylor, 2001). Work continues on assessing the true affinities of hederelloids, but they appear to be most closely related to phoronids and other lophophorates (Taylor and Wilson, 2008; Taylor et al., 2010).

Classification
Family Hederellidae
Genus Diversipora
Genus Hederella
Family Reptariidae
Genus Cystoporella
Genus Hederopsis
Genus Hernodia

References
Bassler, R.S. (1939) The Hederelloidea. A suborder of Paleozoic cyclostomatous Bryozoa. Proceedings of the United States National Museum, 87:25-91.

Taylor, P.D. and Wilson, M.A. (2008) Morphology and affinities of hederelloid "bryozoans", p. 301-309. In: Hageman, S.J., Key, M.M. Jr., and Winston, J.E. (eds.), Bryozoan Studies 2007: Proceedings of the 14th International Bryozoology Conference, Boone, North Carolina, July 1–8, 2007. Virginia Museum of Natural History Special Publication 15.
Wilson, M.A. and Taylor, P.D. (2001) "Pseudobryozoans" and the problem of encruster diversity in the Paleozoic. PaleoBios, 21 (supplement to no. 2):134-135.

Enigmatic animal taxa
Carboniferous invertebrates
Devonian animals
Late Devonian animals
Permian animals
Permian extinctions
Protostome enigmatic taxa
Silurian animals
Silurian first appearances